Tom Thacker (born 11 April 1974), nicknamed Brown Tom, is a Canadian musician. He is the lead guitarist, lead singer and co-founder of the Canadian punk rock group Gob and rhythm guitarist for Sum 41. Thacker formed Gob with Theo Goutzinakis in 1993. Following Dave Baksh's departure from Sum 41 on May 11, 2006, Thacker was recruited as their touring guitarist, and then became an official member in 2009. He has remained with Sum 41 ever since, even after Baksh rejoined the band in 2015, contributing to three studio releases.

Thacker has been in the films Going the Distance and Sharp as Marbles.

Professional career

Gob (1993–present)
Thacker is one of the vocalists and guitarists in the punk rock band Gob. He formed the band with Theo Goutzinakis, Wolfman Pat Integrity on drums, and Kelly Macaulay on bass. They released their self-titled EP in 1994. Since signing a deal with Nettwerk and EMI, the band has released six studio albums. The current bassist and drummer, Steven Fairweather and Gabe Mantle, joined the band after the band went through several other bassists.

Sum 41 (2006–present)
In late 2006, Thacker joined Sum 41 as touring guitarist, replacing former guitarist Dave Baksh. He also plays keyboards for Sum 41, and provides backing vocals.

On June 26, 2009, in a special chat taking place on the website AbsolutePunk.net, Sum 41 frontman Deryck Whibley made it clear that Thacker was now an official member of the band and not just a touring member. On July 20, 2009, Steve Jocz of Sum 41 stated on the band's official website that the band finished all their tour dates for 2009 and confirmed that Thacker will be appearing on the upcoming Sum 41 album.

Even after Dave Baksh rejoined Sum 41 in 2015, Thacker has remained with the group ever since, which expanded them into a five-piece.

Other musical projects

Under the name Tommy, Tom Thacker played drums in the Canadian pop punk The McRackins for their 1995 album What Came First?. He returned again to play on their 1999 release Comicbooks and Bubblegum.

On September 2, 2011, in an interview with Todd Morse of The Operation M.D., he said that the band plans to go on their first ever European tour in December, with possibly Tom Thacker playing lead guitar. Matt Brann is rumored to join the touring line-up on drums. In an interview with Thacker, he has confirmed that he was the one to suggest Cone and Todd to tour with the Operation M.D. in the winter, after Sum 41 cancelled all their tour dates for the rest of 2011.

In 2013 Thacker played 2 shows with The Offspring filling in for touring guitarist Todd Morse. In July and August 2017 he toured with The Offspring again filling in for Morse who was filling in for lead guitarist Noodles.

Discography

Gob
 Gob (1994)
 Too Late... No Friends (1995)
 How Far Shallow Takes You (1998)
 World According to Gob (2001)
 Foot in Mouth Disease (2003)
 Muertos Vivos (2007)
 Gob documentary (2012)
 Apt. 13 (2014)

Sum 41
 All the Good Shit (2009) - live tracks
 Screaming Bloody Murder (2011) - co-wrote the first single
 Live at the House of Blues, Cleveland 9.15.07 (2011)
 13 Voices (2016)
 Order in Decline (2019)
 Heaven and Hell (TBA)

Others
 Various Artists - ''FUBAR: The Album (2002)
  By a Thread (2011) (producer)
 Floodlight (2009) (producer)
Steven Fairweather (2014) (producer)

References

External links

Gob official site
Tom Thacker on Myspace
Gob on Myspace
Interview with Tom and Theo

Living people
1974 births
Canadian punk rock guitarists
Gob (band) members
Lead guitarists
Musicians from British Columbia
Sum 41 members
People from Langley, British Columbia (city)